Mäo may refer to several places in Estonia:

Mäo, Järva County, village in Paide Parish, Järva County
Mäo, Lääne-Viru County, village in Kadrina Parish, Lääne-Viru County